The Little Gruinard is a river in Wester Ross, Scotland which runs from the Fionn Loch into Gruinard Bay (famed for Gruinard Island). It lies within the Letterewe Estate, previously owned by Paul Fentener van Vlissingen, a Dutch businessman. It has a healthy run of Atlantic Salmon. The Little Gruinard has been a forerunner in the development of catch and release fishing amongst Scottish salmon rivers.

See also
Rivers of the United Kingdom
Dundonnell and Fisherfield Forest

External links
Joint Nature Conservation Committee, Little Gruinard River

Gruinard, Little